Balisage is, most commonly in military applications, the use of dim lighting to enable navigation while not giving away one's position to the enemy.

Computer applications usage
It can also refer, in computer applications, to the use of markup to enable document processing while not "giving away" one's data to proprietary software programs from which it might be hard to extract the data later.

This usage may have originated in the fact that the French version of the ISO standard defining SGML, translates the title thus:

Information processing - Text and office systems - Standard Generalized Markup Language (SGML)

Traitement de l'information -- Systèmes bureautiques -- Langage normalisé de balisage généralisé (SGML)

Balisage is also an annual conference on XML and related markup technologies.

References

External links
About.com
ISO Catalogue French entry for the SGML Manual

Military tactics